Tümer Metin (born 14 October 1974) is a Turkish former professional footballer and current pundit.

Metin achieved numerous titles during his career, including Süper Lig titles with respective centenary of both Beşiktaş J.K. and Fenerbahçe S.K. At international level, he scored 7 goals in 26 appearances for the Turkey national team.

Career
Metin was born in Zonguldak. After playing for four years at Samsunspor, he was transferred to Beşiktaş, along with team-mate İlhan Mansız in 2001. He signed a contract with Fenerbahçe in June 2006 after spending five years at Beşiktaş.

Metin's star shone brightly in Europe during the 2006–07 UEFA Cup Round of 32 tie against AZ Alkmaar. In the first leg in Istanbul Metin contributed the Yellow Canaries' first goal as well as the equalizing brace which made the final score 3–3. The second brace was much more spectacular in that his run came from just within the midfield line and his shot, a cracker from the top corner of the 16 yard box, was placed precisely in the top corner of the goal. Metin also scored the opening goal in the reverse fixture in Alkmaar, a precise curling shot into the side netting, but unfortunately for him the result of the match was 2–2, sending Fenerbahçe out of the competition via away goals.

During the January 2008 transfer window, Fenerbahçe sent Metin to Greek Super League side AEL FC, with the loan period to expire in June 2008. So far Metin has found success in Greece, even scoring his first goal in his debut for the new outfit. On 9 August 2011, he signed a one-year contract with Kerkyra. He announced his retirement on 9 December 2011.

Post-retirement
After retirement he penned a memoir, titled "Metin Olmak", published in May 2013. His book includes damning behind-the-scenes revelations on his conflicts with Mircea Lucescu and Rıza Çalımbay, some wonderful exchanges with Vicente Del Bosque, and the accounts of his personal transformation during his later career years in Greece.

In 2019 September Metin joined TRT Spor for punditry.

Personal life
Metin is a Beşiktaş J.K. fan. He has got a tattoo stating "Only God can judge me". In 2019, Metin dated Turkish actress Gamze Topuz, who was featured Turkish TV series including Aşk ve Ceza.

Honours
Beşiktaş
 Süper Lig: 2003
 Turkish Cup: 2006

Fenerbahçe
 Süper Lig: 2007
 Turkish Super Cup: 2007

Turkey
 UEFA European Championship Semi Final: 2008

References

External links
Profile at TFF.org

1974 births
Living people
Sportspeople from Zonguldak
Turkish footballers
Zonguldakspor footballers
Samsunspor footballers
Beşiktaş J.K. footballers
Fenerbahçe S.K. footballers
Turkey international footballers
Turkey B international footballers
Turkish expatriate footballers
Expatriate footballers in Greece
Athlitiki Enosi Larissa F.C. players
UEFA Euro 2008 players
Süper Lig players
Super League Greece players
Turkish expatriate sportspeople in Greece
Association football midfielders
Association football wingers